XHMM-FM is a radio station in Mexico City. Broadcasting on 100.1 MHz, XHMM-FM is owned by NRM Comunicaciones and is known as "Stereo Cien".

History
XHMM signed on in the early 1970s as "Radio Maranatha" after receiving its concession on June 8, 1965. In 1977, the station was acquired by SOMER (Sociedad Mexicana de la Radio), which on July 17 of that year relaunched it as "Stereo Cien" airing contemporary music in English as well as talk programs. Since its inception, the station's logo has featured the image of a dolphin, and a dolphin cry is used as an on-air ID. In 1995, the station was merged into NRM Comunicaciones.

XHMM carries adult contemporary music from the 1980s to the present and the "Enfoque" newscasts on weekdays.

On June 7, 2021, sister station XEOY-AM became a full-time simulcast of XHMM.

References

Radio stations in Mexico City